Loango is a settlement near the coast of the Republic of the Congo.

Location

Loango is in the Loandjili (Pointe Noire) District, Kouilou Department, on the coast to the southwest of Diosso.
It is a few kilometers north of the city of Pointe-Noire.
The town is halfway between Point-Noire and Madingo-Kayes, and since 2002 has been the capital of the Kouilou region.

History

Diosso was the former capital of the Kingdom of Loango and home to its rulers' mausoleum.
Roman Catholic missionaries were active in Diosso, which had a royal palace.
The port of Loango was formerly a major slavery port, but the site has now been abandoned and few traces remain.

The first radiotelegraph link in the tropics, between Brazzaville and Loango, was created around 1910 using techniques developed by Joseph Bethenod, chief engineer of the Société française radio-électrique (SFR).

See also
 Loango slavery harbour

Notes

Sources

Populated places in the Republic of the Congo